Patricia Holmes may refer to:

 Patricia Holmes (cricketer) (1917–1992), Australian cricket player
 Patricia Holmes (diplomat), Australian diplomat
 Patricia Holmes (politician) (born  1959), American politician in Michigan